Plyos is a town in Privolzhsky District of Ivanovo Oblast, Russia, located on the right bank of the Volga River,  northeast of Ivanovo, the administrative center of the oblast. Population:

History
It was founded in 12th century. It was destroyed in 1238 by Mongols.

A border post of the Grand Duchy of Moscow was founded in 1410 by Vasily I. It was granted town status in 1925.

Administrative and municipal status
Within the framework of administrative divisions, Plyos is subordinated to Privolzhsky District. Prior to the adoption of the Law #145-OZ On the Administrative-Territorial Division of Ivanovo Oblast in December 2010, it used to be incorporated separately as an administrative unit with the status equal to that of the districts.

As a municipal division, the town of Plyos, together with twenty-three rural localities in Privolzhsky District, is incorporated within Privolzhsky Municipal District as Plyosskoye Urban Settlement.

References

Notes

Sources

Cities and towns in Ivanovo Oblast
Golden Ring of Russia
Populated places on the Volga
1410 establishments in Europe
15th-century establishments in Russia
Populated places established in the 1410s
Nerekhtsky Uyezd